T-0156 is a phosphodiesterase 5 inhibitor.

References

Naphthyridines
Phosphodiesterase inhibitors
Lactams
Pyridines
Pyrimidines
Methyl esters
Phenol ethers
Methoxy compounds